Distorsio reticularis, common name reticulate distorsio, is a species of medium-sized sea snail, a marine gastropod mollusk in the family Personidae, the Distortio snails.

Subspecies
 Distorsio reticularis francesae Iredale, 1931

Distribution
This species is widespread in the Indo-Western Pacific, including the Persian Gulf, to Melanesia, north to Japan, China Sea, Taiwan, Philippines and south to Queensland.

Habitat
These sea snails live in tropical coral reef, at depths of about 10 to 100 m.

Description
These shells are fusiform, inflated and roughly sculptured with axial and spiral ribs and low axial varices. Spire whorls are irregular, with a wavering suture. The aperture is narrow and distorted (hence the genus name), with strong teeth on the lips and a moderately developed callus. Siphonal canal is rather long and dorsally recurved. Operculum is corneous, irregularly ovate.

Biology
These sea snails probably are carnivorous. Sexes are separate. After hatching larvae are free-swimming.

References

 Spry, J.F. (1961). The sea shells of Dar es Salaam: Gastropods. Tanganyika Notes and Records 56

External links

Bibliography
 A.G. Hinton - Guide to Australian Shells
 A.G. Hinton - Guide to Shells of Papua New Guinea
 A.G. Hinton - Shells of New Guinea & Central Pacific
 B. Dharma - Indonesian Shells I
 Barry Wilson - Australian Marine Shells Part 1
 Beu, A. (2010). Catalogue of Tonnoidea. Pers. comm.
 Deepak Apte – The Book of Indian Shells
 F. Pinn - Sea Snails of Pondicherry
 F. Springsteen and F. M. Leobrera - Shells of the Philippines
 Hsi-Jen Tao - Shells of Taiwan Illustrated in Colour
 Ngoc-Thach Nguyên - Shells of Vietnam
 R. Tucker Abbott - Seashells of South East Asia

Personidae
Gastropods described in 1758
Taxa named by Carl Linnaeus